St Ann's Hospital is a psychiatric hospital located in the Canford Cliffs area of Poole, Dorset. It is managed by Dorset HealthCare University NHS Foundation Trust. It is a Grade II* listed building.

History
The hospital, which was designed by Robert Weir Schultz, was built between 1909 and 1912. A major expansion of the site involving the construction of a new ward block providing 30 extra beds at a cost of £14 million was completed in October 2013.

The Care Quality Commission reported that the hospital team had met all the necessary standards during an inspection in October 2013.

See also 
Holloway Sanatorium

References

Hospital buildings completed in 1912
Hospitals in Dorset
Psychiatric hospitals in England
Buildings and structures in Poole
Grade II* listed buildings in Dorset
1912 establishments in England